Egginton is a civil parish in the South Derbyshire district of Derbyshire, England. The parish contains 13 listed buildings that are recorded in the National Heritage List for England. Of these, one is listed at Grade I, the highest of the three grades, one is at Grade II*, the middle grade, and the others are at Grade II, the lowest grade.  The parish contains the village of Egginton and the surrounding area.  The listed buildings include a church, a pinfold, houses and farmhouses, various bridges, and an aqueduct carrying the Trent and Mersey Canal over the River Dove.


Key

Buildings

References

Citations

Sources

 

Lists of listed buildings in Derbyshire